Indoramin (trade names Baratol and Doralese) is a piperidine antiadrenergic agent.

It is an alpha-1 selective adrenoceptor antagonist with direct myocardial depression action; therefore, it results in no reflex tachycardia. It is also used in benign prostatic hyperplasia (BPH).

It is commonly synthesized from tryptophol.

Dosage
Indoramin is commonly prescribed as 20 mg tablets when used in BPH.

Side Effects
Drowsiness, dizziness, dry mouth, nasal congestion, headache, fatigue, weight gain, hypotension, postural hypotension, depression, problems with ejaculation, diarrhoea, nausea, increased need to pass urine, and palpitations.

Synthesis
Tryptamine and serotonin are naturally occurring indole ethylamino compounds with pronounced pharmacological activities. They have served as the inspiration for synthesis of numerous analogues. 

One such study involved alkylation of 4-benzamidopyridine (2) with 3-(2-Bromoethyl)-1H-indole (1) to give quaternary salt (3); this intermediate was in turn hydrogenated with a Raney nickel catalyst to give indoramine (4).

References

Alpha-1 blockers
Benzamides
Tryptamines
Piperidines